The Mac Diarmida Stakes is a Grade II American Thoroughbred horse race for horses four-years-old and older run over a distance of one-and-three-eighth miles (11 furlongs) on the turf, annually in February at Gulfstream Park in Hallandale Beach, Florida. The current purse is $200,000.

History  

The event was inaugurated on 16 January 1995 for three-year-olds at a distance of 1 mile and 70 yards and was held on the dirt track.

The race was named in honor of Florida-bred Mac Diarmida who was the American Champion Male Turf Horse of 1978. The following year, in 1996 the event was lengthened slightly to one-and-one-sixteenth miles and run on the turf. 

It was run as a handicap from 1997 through 2008 but is now run under allowance weight conditions. The event was upgraded to Grade III in 1997. In 1997, wet weather forced the race to be moved from the turf course to the main dirt track and set at a distance of one-and-one-quarter miles with conditions changed to allow horses four years old and older. In 1998 the race was changed to its present distance of one-and-three-eighths miles.

The race was not run in 2001. The event was upgraded once again in 2007 to Grade II.
The event was originally held in January but since 2017 has been run in late February or early March.

Records
Speed  record  
 miles — 2:10.87 Stream of Gold (IRE) (2008) 

Margins
 lengths — Panama City (1999) 

Most wins
 2 - Presious Passion (2009, 2010)
 2 - Zulu Alpha – (2019, 2020)

Most wins by an owner
 3 - Michael M. Hui (2019, 2020, 2023)

Most wins by a jockey
 4 - Jerry Bailey (1997, 1998, 1999, 2002)

Most wins by a trainer
 4 - Michael J. Maker (2019, 2020, 2022, 2023)

Winners

Legend:

See also
List of American and Canadian Graded races

External links
 2020–21 Gulfstream Park Media Guide

References

Graded stakes races in the United States
Grade 2 stakes races in the United States
Horse races in Florida
Turf races in the United States
Open middle distance horse races
Flat horse races for four-year-olds
Gulfstream Park
Recurring sporting events established in 1995
1995 establishments in Florida